Peter Hadland Davis FLS, FRSE (18 June 1918 – 5 March 1992) was a British botanist.

Life 
Davis was born on 18 June 1918 in Weston-super-Mare. Initially he was educated at the Nash House, Burnham-on-Sea and then continued his education at Bradfield College and later in Maiden Erlegh near Reading, Berkshire . In 1937 he began training at Ingwersen's Alpine Plant Nursery in East Grinstead and became interested in botany.

In 1938 he began his first botanical expedition, albeit as an amateur on his own initiative. He visited the Middle East and Turkey, but had to break off his trip in 1939 at the beginning of World War II. He was called up into the army and served until 1945. The last two years of his time in the army he spent time in Cairo. Immediately after he was demobbed, Davis moved to Scotland to study botany at the University of Edinburgh.

In 1950 he began the research project that eventually became the Flora of Turkey and the East Aegean Islands. In 1952 he received his PhD on Taxonomy of Middle East flora. In the 1950s, Davis made many overseas trips, collecting plants in Kurdistan, Russia and the Middle East. In 1959 he was honoured with the Cuthbert Peek Award of the Royal Geographical Society for his expedition to Kurdistan.

In 1955 he was elected a Fellow of the Royal Society of Edinburgh. His proposers were Sir William Wright Smith, Alexander Nelson, John Anthony and Brian Burtt.

From 1961 he intensified his efforts to complete the Flora of Turkey, which was finally completed in 1985. In 1963 he obtained a D.Sc. qualification from the University of Edinburgh, presenting the thesis "Contributions to the flora of Turkey". He was invited to serve as regional adviser for Turkey on the Flora Europaea project. He was awarded the Symposium Medal during the International Symposium on the Problems of Balkan Flora and Vegetation, and was honoured by the Turkish government for his outstanding achievements in science. He later received the Gold Medal of the Linnean Society of London for his commitment to the Royal Botanic Garden Edinburgh. In the 1980s, he was awarded the Neill Medal of the Royal Society of Edinburgh for his contributions to plant taxonomy.

He died in Edinburgh, 5 March 1992. Under the terms of his will he endowed the Davis Expedition Fund, to assist Edinburgh students to undertake biological fieldwork abroad, as he had done.

The plant taxa Biarum davisii, Symphytum davisii, Atriplex davisii, Vicia davisii, Fritillaria davisii, Digitalis davisiana, Papaver davisii and  Alopecurus davisii are named after him.

Selected works 
 (ten volumes)

References

Further reading 

1918 births
1992 deaths
20th-century British botanists
British Army personnel of World War II